The English Liberal Democrats, officially the Liberal Democrats in England, is the state party within the Liberal Democrats that operates in England. It is a federation of the eleven regional parties in England which are further divided into local parties. The party currently holds 10 of the 533 English seats in the House of Commons and two of the 25 seats in the London Assembly.

Organisation

English Council
The English Council is the sovereign body of the English party.
It consists of the chairs of regional parties, representatives elected by regional party members, and representatives of the organisation representing youth and student members within the English party.
The Council meets twice each year and elects the English Council Executive.

English Executive
The English Council Executive manages the running of the English party between English Council Meetings. The English Council Executive consists of the Chairs of the 11 English regional parties, 12 members directly elected from the English Council, the English Young Liberals Chair. The English Representatives to federal bodies also attend. The English Council Executive meets 6 times a year.

The English Council Executive has three sub-committees; A Finance and Administration Sub-Committee which is chaired by a Treasurer manages the finances of the English party, the Regional Parties Committee and the English Candidates Committee.

The English Council Executive is elected annually in November, and takes office on 1 January of each year:

Regional parties
The English Liberal Democrats is a federation of the eleven regional parties which follow the boundaries of the English Regions, with the exception of South East England and South West England which are each divided into two regional parties. Each regional party is governed by a conference and AGM held in the autumn of every year. The conference elects a Regional Executive, led by a Regional Chair. The regional executive includes all Liberal Democrat members of parliament representing constituencies within the region, all Members of the House of Lords who are members of the regional party, ordinary party members elected from within the region, and additional members co-opted by the executive.

The regional parties within the English party are:
Devon and Cornwall (South West England)
East of England
East Midlands
London Liberal Democrats 
North East England
North West England
South Central (South East England)
South East (South East England)
Western Counties (South West England)
West Midlands
Yorkshire and the Humber

Policy and functions
The English party has responsibilities for the organisation of local parties, co-ordination of the activities of regional parties, resolution of disputes between regional parties, selection of English representatives to federal bodies and establishing the rules for selection of party candidates.

The English Party constitution states that the Liberal Democrats in England "shall determine the policy of the Party on matters affecting England which fall outside the remit of the Federal Party" This can be achieved by structures established by the English Council.
As no policy making structures are currently in place, policy making has been passed up to federal level and English policies discussed at federal party conferences.

Elected representatives

Members of Parliament

 Daisy Cooper – St Albans
 Sir Ed Davey – Kingston and Surbiton
 Tim Farron – Westmorland and Lonsdale
 Richard Foord - Tiverton and Honiton
 Sarah Green – Chesham and Amersham
 Wera Hobhouse – Bath
 Layla Moran – Oxford West and Abingdon
 Helen Morgan - North Shropshire
 Sarah Olney - Richmond Park
 Munira Wilson – Twickenham

London Assembly members

 Hina Bokhari
 Caroline Pidgeon

Directly elected mayors

 Dave Hodgson – Mayor of Bedford
 Peter Taylor – Mayor of Watford

Appointments

House of Lords

List of chairs of the English Liberal Democrats
Chairs are elected in November and take office on 1 January the following year for a two-year term. They are eligible to stand for re-election, but must not serve as Chair for more than four years in a six-year period. 

Paul Farthing (c 1994–1999)
Dawn Davidson (c 2000–2003)
Stan Collins (2004–2006)
Brian Orrell (2007–2009)
Jonathan Davies (2010–2011)
Peter Ellis (2012–2014)
Steve Jarvis (2015–2016)
Liz Leffman (2017–2018)
Tahir Maher (2019)
 Gerald Vernon-Jackson (2020)
 Alison Rouse (2021–Present)

See also
Liberal Democrats
London Liberal Democrats
Scottish Liberal Democrats
Welsh Liberal Democrats
Northern Ireland Liberal Democrats

References

External links 
 

Regional parties within England
Devon and Cornwall regional party
East of England regional party
East Midlands regional party
Greater London regional party
North East regional party
North West regional party
South East regional party
South Central regional party
West Midlands regional party
Western Counties regional party
Yorkshire and the Humber regional party

Organisation of the Liberal Democrats (UK)
Liberal parties in the United Kingdom
Political parties established in 1988
Political parties in England
1988 establishments in England
Politics of England
Devolution in the United Kingdom